Micriantha is a genus of moths of the family Noctuidae.

Species
Micriantha decorata Frivaldsky, 1845

References
Natural History Museum Lepidoptera genus database

Heliothinae